Patrick Prendergast (1926 – 26 September 2021) was a Gaelic footballer. At club level, he played with Dungloe and Ballintubber and was a member of the Donegal and Mayo senior football teams. He usually lined out as a full-back.

Playing career

Although born in Ballintubber, County Mayo, Prendergast first came to prominence with the Dungloe club in Donegal. His performances at club level earned a call-up to the Donegal senior football team. After a number of years with Donegal, Prendergast declared for the Mayo senior football team in 1948. His debut season with his native county saw him win the first of four consecutive Connacht Championship titles, however, the season ended with an All-Ireland final defeat by Cavan. Prendergast lined out at full-back when Mayo won back-to-back All-Ireland Championship titles after defeats of Louth in 1950 and Meath in 1951. He continued to line out with the team until 1956, by which time he had claimed a fifth Connacht Championship title as well as two National League titles. Prendergast was also a Railway Cup-winner with Connacht.

Personal life and death
Paddy spent his entire working career as a member of the Garda Síochána. After being initially stationed in Dungloe, County Donegal, he was later posted back to Mayo and eventually settled in Tralee, County Kerry.

Prendergast died on 26 September 2021, at the age of 95. He was the last surviving member of Mayo's 1951 All-Ireland final-winning starting fifteen.

Honours

Mayo
All-Ireland Senior Football Championship: 1950, 1951
Connacht Senior Football Championship: 1948, 1949, 1950, 1951, 1955
National Football League: 1948–49, 1953–54

Connacht
Railway Cup: 1951

References

1926 births
2021 deaths
Ballintubber Gaelic footballers
Donegal inter-county Gaelic footballers
Mayo inter-county Gaelic footballers
Connacht inter-provincial Gaelic footballers
Irish police officers